Kokapur is a census town in the Barasat I CD block of the Barasat Sadar subdivision in the North 24 Parganas district in the Indian state of West Bengal. It is close to Kolkata and also a part of Kolkata Urban Agglomeration.

Geography

Location

Kokapur, Chak Barbaria, Barbaria, Berunanpukuria and Jagannathpur form a loose cluster of villages and census towns along State Highway 2 (locally known as Barasat-Barrackpore Road), close to Barasat.

Duttapukur police station has jurisdiction over Barasat I CD Block.

Area overview
The area covered in the map alongside is largely a part of the north Bidyadhari Plain. located in the lower Ganges Delta. The country is flat. It is a little raised above flood level and the highest ground borders the river channels.54.67% of the people of the densely populated area lives in the urban areas and 45.33% lives in the rural  areas.

Note: The map alongside presents some of the notable locations in the subdivision. All places marked in the map are linked in the larger full screen map.

Demographics
 India census, Kokapur had a population of 6,317; of this, 3,248 are male, 3,069 female. It has an average literacy rate of 82.34%, higher than the national average of 74.04%.

Infrastructure
As per District Census Handbook 2011, Kokapur covered an area of 1.4826 km2. It had 9 primary schools and 1 middle school, the nearest secondary school and senior secondary were 2 km away at Nilganj. The nearest degree college was 1 km away at Berunanpukuria. The nearest hospital was 8 km away, the nearest family welfare centre 5 km away, the nearest maternity and child welfare centre 5 km away, and the nearest maternity home 15 km away.

Transport
State Highway 2 (locally known as Barasat-Barrackpore Road) passes through Kokapur.

The nearest railway stations are Barasat Junction railway station on the Sealdah-Bangaon line and Barrackpore railway station on the Sealdah-Ranaghat line.

Healthcare
North 24 Parganas district has been identified as one of the areas where ground water is affected by arsenic contamination.

See also
Map of Barasat I CD Block on Page 393 of District Census Handbook.

References

Cities and towns in North 24 Parganas district